Evergreen Everblue is a music album by popular children's entertainer Raffi, released in 1990. The album was aimed at an older audience than most of Raffi's children's albums. The songs on this album are ecology-themed.

Track listing
"Intro/Evergreen, Everblue" – 4:51
"Mama's Kitchen" – 3:31
"Big Beautiful Planet" – 3:23
"Alive and Dreaming" – 3:46
"Where I Live" – 4:05
"What's the Matter With Us" – 3:42
"Our Dear, Dear Mother" – 3:15
"Just Like the Sun" – 2:44
"Clean Rain" – 3:07
"One Light, One Sun" – 2:09
"We Are Not Alone" – 4:10

References

1990 albums
MCA Records albums
Raffi (musician) albums

Rounder Records albums